On 1 May 2019, a landmine killed 15 Indian police and their driver in Gadchiroli, state of Maharashtra, India. Police have blamed the blast on Maoist because they are common in the area. The attack took place after Maoist set 25 vehicles on fire. Hours after the attack Prime Minister Narendra Modi condemned the attack.

References 

2019 murders in India
Communist terrorism
Mass murder in 2019
May 2019 crimes in Asia
Naxalite–Maoist insurgency
Terrorist incidents in India in 2019